Mizhar Abdullah Ruaid (born 1952) is a former Arab Socialist Ba'ath Party official in the Dujail region of Iraq, and the son of Abdullah Kadhem Ruaid. He was arrested in 2005 by US Forces while still living in Dujail.  The arresting unit was A/1-128 Infantry of the Wisconsin Army National Guard.  He was convicted of involvement in the killings of 148 Shia Muslims during the Al-Dujail trial of Saddam Hussein, and was sentenced to 15 years in prison.

References

Living people
Arab Socialist Ba'ath Party – Iraq Region politicians
Iraqi people convicted of murder
People convicted of murder by Iraq
1952 births